Selenia alciphearia, known generally as the northern selenia or brown-tipped thorn, is a species of geometrid moth in the family Geometridae. It is found in North America.

The MONA or Hodges number for Selenia alciphearia is 6817.

References

Further reading

External links

 

Ennominae
Articles created by Qbugbot
Moths described in 1860